Johann Christoph Weigel, known as Christoph Weigel the Elder (9 November 1654 – 5 February 1725), was a German engraver, art dealer and publisher.  He was born at Redwitz, Free imperial city of Eger in Egerland, and died in Nuremberg, aged 70.

References

External links
 

1654 births
1725 deaths
German engravers
German art dealers
German publishers (people)